Gustav Mendonça Wikheim (born 18 March 1993) is a Norwegian footballer who plays for Djurgårdens IF as a winger.

Career

Strømsgodset
Wikheim made his debut for Strømsgodset on 10 April 2011 against Odd, in a match his club won 2–0. He scored his first goal in a 2–1 loss against Molde on 23 March 2012. He gradually played more and more for Strømsgodset, and got his major breakthrough in the 2014 season, when he featured in 27 of the 30 league matches for the club.

KAA Gent
On 17 December 2015, Wikheim signed a contract lasting until June 2019 with Belgian club KAA Gent, in a €1.6 million deal.

Loan to FC Midtjylland
In the dying hours of the summer 2016 transfer deadline, Wikheim was presented in FC Midtjylland on a one-year loan with a buy-out option included from KAA Gent. Wikheim had a good season at FCM, and the club decidede to sign him permanently on a four-year contract.

International
Wikheim was called up for the Norway U18 team in February 2011. He played 13 matches and scored 2 goals, before moving up on the Norway U19 team in February 2012. He played 6 matches, but did not score any goals. In February 2013, he was called up for his first Norway U21 match. He was capped 12 times, scoring one goal. In October 2014, he was called up for the Norway U23 team, and has played twice without scoring.

Personal life
Wikheim is the half-brother of Lars Fuhre, another professional footballer. Their common mother is Brazilian, and the two boys grew up together in Hokksund, Norway.

Career statistics

Honours

Club
Strømsgodset:
 Norwegian League: 2013

FC Midtjylland:
 Danish Superliga: 2017-18
 Danish Cup:  2018–19

References

1993 births
Living people
People from Øvre Eiker
Sportspeople from Drammen
Association football midfielders
Norwegian footballers
Norway under-21 international footballers
Norway youth international footballers
Norwegian expatriate footballers
Norwegian people of Brazilian descent
Strømsgodset Toppfotball players
K.A.A. Gent players
FC Midtjylland players
Al-Fateh SC players
Eliteserien players
Belgian Pro League players
Danish Superliga players
Saudi Professional League players
Expatriate footballers in Belgium
Expatriate men's footballers in Denmark
Norwegian expatriate sportspeople in Belgium
Expatriate footballers in Saudi Arabia
Norwegian expatriate sportspeople in Saudi Arabia
Djurgårdens IF Fotboll players
Allsvenskan players